Max Power may refer to:

 Max Power (magazine), a UK motoring magazine
 Max Power (footballer) (born 1993), English professional footballer for Wigan Athletic
 A pseudonym taken by Homer Simpson in The Simpsons episode "Homer to the Max"

See also
 Maximum power (disambiguation)